A mashgiach ruchani (pl., mashgichim ruchani'im) or mashgicha ruchani – sometimes mashgiach/mashgicha for short – is a spiritual supervisor or guide. He or she is usually a rabbi who has an official position within a yeshiva and is responsible for the non-academic areas of yeshiva students' lives.

The position of mashgiach/mashgicha ruchani arose with the establishment of the modern "Lithuanian-style" mussar yeshivas. The prototype of this new type of rabbinical leader and educator was Rabbi Nosson Tzvi Finkel (1849-1927) known as the Alter (elder) of the Slabodka yeshiva, Yeshivas Knesses Yisrael (Slabodka), in Lithuania.

The role of the mashgiach/mashgicha ruchani was strongest in the era prior to World War II, when often the mashgichim were responsible for maintaining the yeshiva financially, recruiting and interviewing new students, and hiring staff, something akin to academic deans. After the Holocaust, the influence and position of the mashgiach/mashgicha decreased, and the roles of the rosh yeshivas have grown at the expense of those of the mashgichim. A modern mashgiach/mashgicha is somewhat equivalent to the secular counselor position.

The need for having mashgichim within the modern yeshivas was tied in with the rise of the modern mussar movement (teaching of Jewish ethics), inspired by the 19th-century rabbi Yisrael Lipkin Salanter, and was seen as necessary because yeshiva students faced greater pressures and problems from the world outside their yeshiva studies.

Some yeshivas may refer to a mashgiach/mashgicha ruchani as a menahel ruchani (the word menahel means 'principal', as in the principal of a school, or 'supervisor'.)

Chabad yeshivas have a similar position referred to as mashpia, meaning a person who provides (spiritual) influence.

Famous mashgichim

Nosson Tzvi Finkel (1849-1927) mashgiach ruchani of Yeshivas Knesses Yisrael (Slabodka), Lithuania
Yehuda Leib Chasman, mashgiach ruchani of the Hebron Yeshiva, Israel
Eliyahu Eliezer Dessler (1892-1953), mashgiach ruchani of the Ponevezh yeshiva in Bnei Brak, Israel
Binyamin Finkel, mashgiach ruchani of Yeshivas Mishkan Yisrael, Jerusalem
Yechezkel Levenstein (1895-1974), mashgiach ruchani of Mir yeshiva, Poland 
Yeruchom Levovitz (1873-1936), mashgiach ruchani of the Mir yeshiva, Poland
Moshe Rosenstein (1880-1941), mashgiach ruchani of Lomza Yeshiva, Poland
Don Segal
Beryl Weisbord, mashgiach ruchani of Yeshivas Ner Yisroel, Baltimore
Elyah Lopian (1876-1970) mashgiach ruchani of Knesses Chizkiyahu, Israel
Matisyahu Salomon, mashgiach ruchani of Gateshead Yeshiva and later, Beth Medrash Govoha (the Lakewood Yeshiva)
Nosson Meir Wachtfogel (1910-1998), mashgiach ruchani of Beth Medrash Govoha (the Lakewood Yeshiva), USA, from 1941-1998
Shlomo Wolbe (1914-2005)
Dov Yaffe (d. 2017), mashgiach ruchani of Knesses Chizkiyahu, Israel
Avigdor Miller (1908-2001) mashgiach ruchani of Yeshiva Rabbi Chaim Berlin, USA, from 1944-1964
Shlomo Carlebach (scholar), (1925-2022) mashgiach ruchani of Yeshiva Rabbi Chaim Berlin, USA, from 1966-1978

See also
Rosh Yeshiva
Mussar movement
Mashpia

References

External links
 

 
Jewish religious occupations
Orthodox rabbinic roles and titles
Musar movement
Hebrew words and phrases